Renee Heath is an Australian politician who is a current member for Eastern Victoria Region in the Victorian Legislative Council. She is a member of the Liberal Party and was preselected for the 2022 state election, defeating Cathrine Burnett-Wake as the first person on the Liberal Party's group voting ticket for the Eastern Victoria Region.

Political career and personal life 
Heath is a lifelong member of the “ultra-conservative City Builders’ church,” a church led in Australia by her father that is accused of having historic links to gay conversion practices. Her preselection was controversial and viewed as a victory for the conservative faction of the Liberal Party over its moderate faction. At the time of Heath's preselection, other Eastern Victorian Liberals and former members of the City Builders church spoke out about the church's “ambitions to shift Victorian politics to the hard right.”

Following revelations of Heath's role in the church and its opposition to gay, transgender and reproductive rights, Liberal leader Matthew Guy announced prior to the election that if and when elected, Heath would not be allowed to join the Liberal Party's parliamentary caucus. This followed criticism by her Liberal Party predecessor, Cathrine Burnett-Wake, who in her final speech in parliament called on "ordinary people" to "awaken" to extremist political candidates. Burnett-Wake referred to the ‘taking over’ of Liberal Party branches in Gippsland by right-wing church groups and told the parliament she was concerned about infiltration of the Liberal party by people with "extremist" views - widely interpreted as a reference to Heath.

Following Heath's election and Guy stepping down as leader of the party, this decision to exclude Heath from the parliamentary party was overturned by new Liberal leader John Pesutto. Heath was also appointed by Pesutto to be the Secretary of the Parliamentary Liberal Party for the 60th Parliament of Victoria. In her inaugural speech, Heath stated that "Victorians should not be told what to think, what to say, how to worship, how to raise their children. This is symptomatic of a failed socialist experiment which has reinvented itself as a cultural movement in our time."

Reference List

External links
 First speech to Parliament

Year of birth missing (living people)
Liberal Party of Australia members of the Parliament of Victoria
Members of the Victorian Legislative Council
21st-century Australian politicians
People from Morwell, Victoria
Women members of the Victorian Legislative Council
21st-century Australian women politicians
Living people